Eremophila linearis, commonly known as harlequin fuchsia bush, is a flowering plant in the figwort family, Scrophulariaceae and is endemic to Western Australia. It is a shrub with long leaves, sticky, shiny leaves and branches and bright red flowers

Description
Eremophila linearis is a glabrous shrub with sticky, shiny leaves and branches due to the presence of large amounts of resin. The leaves are arranged alternately and densely clustered near the ends of the branches.

The tube is bright red to orange-red on the top and yellow below and inside the tube. The outside of the petal tube usually has scattered hairs but the inside surface of the lobes is glabrous while there are some long hairs inside the tube. The 4 stamens extend beyond the end of the petal tube.

Taxonomy and naming
Eremophila linearis was first formally described by botanist Robert Chinnock in Journal of the Adelaide Botanic Garden in 1980. The specific epithet (linearis) is a Latin word meaning "linear".

Distribution
Harlequin fuchsia bush is widespread in central Western Australia, especially between Meekatharra and Newman in the Gascoyne and Murchison biogeographic regions. It grows in clay-loam or sandy loam in depressions, river flats and rocky slopes.

Conservation status
This species is classified as "not threatened" by the Western Australian Government Department of Parks and Wildlife.

Use in horticulture
Harlequin fuchsia bush is a compact, slow-growing but long lived shrub with bright green foliage and red flowers. Its growth habit makes it suitable as a windbreak or screening plant. It is one of the eremophilas that can be propagated from seed but only with difficulty from cuttings. Unless propagated by grafting onto Myoporum rootstock, it needs well-drained soil. It will grow in full sun or filtered shade and only requires occasional watering during a long drought. It will tolerate frost although severe frosts may damage branches that should be removed when the weather warms in spring.

References

Eudicots of Western Australia
linearis
Endemic flora of Western Australia
Plants described in 1980
Taxa named by Robert Chinnock